Summer School is a 1987 American comedy film directed by Carl Reiner and starring Mark Harmon as a high school gym teacher who is forced to teach a remedial English class during the summer. The film co-stars Kirstie Alley and Courtney Thorne-Smith. It was distributed by Paramount Pictures and produced by George Shapiro and Howard West. The original music score was composed by Danny Elfman.

Plot
On the last day of school before summer vacation, physical education teacher Freddy Shoop (Mark Harmon) is preparing for a vacation to Hawaii with his girlfriend, Kim. Vice principal Phil Gills (Robin Thomas) hands out paper slips informing several underachievers that they must attend summer school for remedial English. This includes: easily distracted Pam House (Courtney Thorne-Smith); "nocturnal" Larry Kazamias, a male stripper (Ken Olandt); football jock Kevin Winchester (Patrick Labyorteaux); pregnant Rhonda Altobello (Shawnee Smith); geeky Alan Eakian (Richard Steven Horvitz); dyslexic Denise Green (Kelly Jo Minter); intimidating Jerome Watkins (Duane Davis), and two horror-film-obsessed underachievers, Dave Frazier (Gary Riley) and Francis Gremp, a.k.a. "Chainsaw" (Dean Cameron).

The teacher scheduled to teach the class, Mr. Dearadorian (Carl Reiner), wins the lottery and immediately quits, so Gills seeks an emergency replacement among the teachers still on school grounds, but each manages to evade him, guessing what he wants them to do. He finally corners Shoop, blackmailing him into taking the job or lose tenure.

On his first day, Shoop meets Robin Bishop (Kirstie Alley), who is teaching American History next door. He falls for her, but she is already dating Gills. His first day is a disaster. Most of the students slack around, and Jerome goes to the bathroom and doesn't return. A beautiful Italian transfer student, Anna-Maria Mazarelli (Fabiana Udenio), is transferred to the class in order for her to work on her English, much to the delight of Dave and Chainsaw. After some students inexplicably leave and the remaining ones attempt to leave class as well, Shoop admits he has no idea how to teach them. Rather than studying, he and the students spend their first few days having fun going on "Field Trips" to the beach, a theme park, and a petting zoo until Alan's grandmother finds out and tells Gills.

Gills threatens to fire Shoop unless his students pass the end-of-term test. Shoop negotiates with each teen to grant them a favor if they study. The kids agree, so he gives Denise driving lessons, accompanies Rhonda to Lamaze classes, gives Kevin football lessons, allows Dave and Chainsaw to throw a party in his house and gives them rides to school, gives Larry a bed in the classroom, lets Chainsaw arrange a screening of The Texas Chain Saw Massacre in class and allows Pam to move in with him. Seeing he is still floundering as a teacher, Robin tells Shoop to make learning fun. He begins to grow closer to the kids. They study to pass their English basic skills exam, worried that Gills will fire him unless all his students pass.

Shoop is arrested, covering for Chainsaw and Dave after they are found in possession of alcohol. He calls Robin and she and Gills to bail him out of jail. Gills then inadvertently exposes his true self to Robin when he states he cares nothing for Shoop or his students and she overhears, causing her to storm off. Larry loses his stripper job when he is found out by his aunt and his mother, who go to the club where he works. The students make more demands on Shoop. He throws an English book against the chalkboard and, after listing his sacrifices to grant their favors, quits his job in anger. His students start feeling guilty, and scare off Shoop's dull replacement with a series of gory stunts reminiscent of The Texas Chain Saw Massacre. Finding Shoop moping on the beach whilst eating ice cream, they ask him to return, and he accepts.

Shoop and his students then begin preparing for the test in earnest, and even Jerome, who had "gone to the bathroom" weeks before, returns. The exam goes smoothly, despite Rhonda going into labor during the test; she later puts the child up for adoption. Gills tells Shoop the average of grades was below passing, so he is ready to fire him. However, the students' parents come to defend him. Due to the students' marked improvement, Principal Kelban (Francis X. McCarthy) grants Shoop tenure for his positive efforts.

Shoop returns to the beach with his dog and Robin. He asks her to a dinner date for the last time, and she accepts at last, kissing him in the sunset.

Cast

 Mark Harmon as Freddy Shoop
 Kirstie Alley as Robin Bishop
 Robin Thomas as Vice Principal Phil Gills
 Courtney Thorne-Smith as Pam House
 Dean Cameron as Francis "Chainsaw" Gremp
 Gary Riley as Dave Frazier
 Patrick Labyorteaux as Kevin Winchester
 Kelly Jo Minter as Denise Green
 Shawnee Smith as Rhonda Altobello
 Richard Horvitz as Alan Eakian
 Ken Olandt as Larry Kazamias
 Fabiana Udenio as Anna-Maria Mazarelli
 Duane Davis as Jerome Watkins (Bathroom Guy)
 Tom Troupe as Judge Stuart R. Dryer
 Francis X. McCarthy as Principal Kelban (credited as Frank McCarthy)
 Carl Reiner as Mr. Dearadorian
 Andrea Howard as Woman at Strip Joint

Soundtrack
The Summer School soundtrack, on Chrysalis, consists of 1980s rock and dance songs with performers including Paul Engemann, Blondie, E. G. Daily, The Fabulous Thunderbirds, Vinnie Vincent, Billy Burnette, and Elisa Fiorillo.

Some songs that appear in the film, including James Brown's, "Papa's Got a Brand New Bag" and Eddie Murphy's "Party All the Time", do not appear on the soundtrack. The movie is also notable for containing the only completely unreleased Danny Elfman film score to date.

Daily's "Mind over Matter" was released as a single off the soundtrack. It became a top 10 dance hit in the US and hit #96 in the UK in 1988. The song was originally recorded by Debbie Harry, but label disputes caused her recording to go unreleased and Daily was chosen to sing it instead. The song was produced at PWL by Mike Stock, Matt Aitken and Pete Waterman.

Track listing
"Happy" – credited to Danny Elfman (actually performed by Elfman's band Oingo Boingo, but credit changed for contractual reasons) (3:57)
"Mind over Matter" – E. G. Daily (4:21)
"Jackie" – Elisa Fiorillo (3:41)
"I'm Supposed to Have Sex with You" – Tonio K (5:00)
"Seduction" – E.G. Daily (3:41)
"Brain Power" – Paul Engemann (4:09)
"All I Want from You" – Tami Show (5:09)
"Second Language" – Tone Norum (3:40)
"My Babe"  – The Fabulous Thunderbirds (2:36)
"Get an Education" – Billy Burnette (3:45)

Reception
Summer School holds a 56% approval rating on Rotten Tomatoes based on 34 reviews; the average rating is 5.4/10 indicating mixed or average reviews. Roger Ebert gave the film ½ out of four stars, calling it "listless, leisurely and unspirited". Metacritic gave the film a score of 27 based on 9 reviews, indicating "generally unfavorable reviews".

The film grossed $35.7 million in the United States, becoming the 32nd highest-grossing film of 1987.

DVD release
A bare-bones DVD edition of Summer School was released by Paramount Home Entertainment in 2004. This was followed by a special edition DVD, known as the "Life's a Beach Edition", which was released on May 22, 2007.

Shout Factory released a Blu-ray, including the 2007 bonus features and adding a discussion with Richard Steven Horvitz, on Feb 8, 2022

Remake
Along with the special edition DVD release commemorating the twentieth anniversary of Summer School, many of the original cast were present for a reunion party. During an audience Q&A, Dean Cameron suggested that he would be open to a sequel or possibly even a remake of the original. When asked who he would cast as Chainsaw, he suggested Shia LaBeouf or Zach Braff.

In early 2012, Adam Sandler's production company Happy Madison Productions signed on for a remake.

References

External links
 
 
 
 DVDTalk Review of the "Life's a Beach" Special Edition
 Full video of "Mind Over Matter" on YouTube

1980s high school films
1980s teen comedy films
1987 films
1987 comedy films
American teen comedy films
American high school films
1980s English-language films
Films about educators
Paramount Pictures films
Films directed by Carl Reiner
Films scored by Danny Elfman
1980s American films